Lionel Hutson (27 October 1891 – 28 July 1941) was a Barbadian cricketer. He played in two first-class matches for the Barbados cricket team in 1922/23 and 1924/25.

See also
 List of Barbadian representative cricketers

References

External links
 

1891 births
1941 deaths
Barbadian cricketers
Barbados cricketers
People from Saint Michael, Barbados